The Rage is a 2008 Italian film directed by Louis Nero.

Plot
A young director lives with a girl. Active part of the Intellectual society, he represents perfectly the union between fear and determination, that changes deeply his way of understanding the world that surrounds him. His only aim is to leave a footstep of his presence on this world realizing a film.

References

External links
 
 

Italian drama films
2008 films
Films directed by Louis Nero
2000s Italian-language films
2000s Italian films